The Cast Courts (originally called the Architectural Courts) of the Victoria and Albert Museum in London, England, comprise two large halls. Unusually for a museum, the Cast Courts house a collection not of originals, but copies. Here are to be found reproductions of some of the most famous sculptures in the world. Most of the copies were made in the 19th century and in many cases they have better resisted the ravages of time, 20th-century pollution and over-zealous conservation than the originals. In a few cases, such as the late 15th century Lübeck relief of Christ washing the Apostles' feet, the original has been destroyed and the cast is a unique record of a lost work.

History
The practice of reproducing famous sculptures in plaster dates back to the sixteenth century when Leone Leoni assembled a collection of casts in Milan, he collected: "as many of the most celebrated works... carved and cast, antique and modern as he was able to obtain anywhere". Such private collections, however, remained modest and uncommon until the 18th century. By 1800 there were extensive collections in Berlin, Paris, Vienna and elsewhere.

Early in the 19th century there was growing interest in medieval art, and, perhaps as an expression of national pride, casts were made of outstanding national monuments particularly in France and Germany.

In Britain, from 1841 onwards, a collection of art from all periods and countries was being assembled by the Government School of Design. In 1852 this collection was taken over by the Museum of Manufactures when it was established at Marlborough House. By 1858 the museum had moved to its current location in South Kensington and the casts were displayed in various corridors and galleries. 

In 1862, the collection was inflated by the acquisition of over 2,000 casts of decorative wood carving that had been used as examples for the craftsmen working on the new Westminster Palace. 

By around 1860 the previously haphazard means of acquisition was supplemented by a more systematic approach: a list was drawn up of copies it was thought desirable to acquire and soon plans were drawn up to house them. As with the acquisition of original sculptures, this work was driven primarily by Henry Cole and John Charles Robinson. In contrast to other national collections, the collection at the V&A was conceived as being international in scope. Casts were acquired throughout the 1860s and 70s. Many of the casts were commissioned by the Museum or purchased from French or German firms. Other casts were obtained through exchange with other museums. 

In 1864 plans for an international exchange of copies of 'the finest works of art which each country possesses' were drawn up by Henry Cole and the assistance of the Foreign Office was sought to obtain lists of major works in the possession of other European governments. This ambitious scheme culminated in 15 European princes being persuaded to sign up to the International Convention of promoting universally Reproductions of Works of Art at the Paris International Exhibition of 1867. With this agreement, the Victoria and Albert Museum came to acquire the large and diverse collection of casts that it has today. 

The Courts were designed by Major General Henry Scott of the Royal Engineers and were opened to the public in July 1873. The Courts are architecturally dramatic: they are large and high. The West Court is topped by a roof of glass that admits sunlight which is supplemented by electric lights; it predominantly contains casts of Northern European and Spanish sculpture and Trajan's Column. The East Court has a high ceiling and has casts of Italian monuments. The two Courts are divided by corridors on two levels; the mid-level corridor allows the Courts to be viewed from above. The West Court (that includes Trajan's Column) also has a vertiginously high walkway around it at a third level. The walkway is contiguous with a space that is used to store objects, mostly casts, that are not on public display; the walkway and storage area are not open to the public. It is said that the proportions of the West Court were informed by the need to display Trajan's column and the imposing Portico de la Gloria.

When the cast courts first opened, they included displays of large scale architectural model and many casts of architectural details, hence the original name Architectural Courts. 

When the courts first opened to the public they attracted much attention although the initial press reaction was mixed. The Art Journal, while generally favourable, was particularly critical of the inclusion of Trajan's Column which had the 'effect of crowding out of sight those (casts) of more sensible proportions' — a criticism that seems justified. Other museums also received casts, but chose to display the frieze in an unrolled manner and presented at eye level, as can now be seen at the Museum of Roman Civilization and National Museum of Romanian History.

In the 1920s, discussions within the museum focused on the lack of space for display. It was suggested that the cast collection be moved to The Crystal Palace where another large collection of casts was also housed. The proposed move was rejected by the then director, Eric Maclagan which was fortunate because in 1936 Crystal Palace was destroyed by fire. Twenty three casts, mainly effigies, that escaped the inferno were transferred to the museum and were the last major additions to the cast collection.

Major exhibits

Trajan's Column

The full height of Trajan's Column could not possibly be accommodated and the column is divided into two roughly equal parts. The original column in Rome is some 30m high and includes an internal spiral staircase which leads to a platform at the top. The cast is of the huge pedestal and the entire column, but excludes the viewing platform. The original statue on the top was lost in antiquity. The pedestal is covered in illustrations of booty from the Dacian Wars and the column is covered in a detailed frieze illustrating the conquest of Dacia by the Roman emperor Trajan.

The frieze spirals around the column and describes in narrative form two wars against Dacia, the first (AD 101–102) is illustrated in the lower portion of the column, and the second (AD 105–106) in the upper portion. The dividing point on the column is marked by a personification of Victory writing on a shield and this is approximately the point at which the cast of the column is divided.

The column was cast in many small parts and these parts were reassembled on brick chimney-like structures built especially for the purpose. Just as on the original there is a door on the cast of the pedestal that affords access to the interior, but within the cast there is nothing to be seen but the white painted interior of the brick chimney. The upper portion is similarly hollow, but there is no means of access.

In Rome the frieze is extremely difficult to see. The viewing conditions in the museum are also less than optimal. Consequently, the only part of the frieze that can be examined closely by the public is the bottom of the upper portion. The mid-level corridor does afford an alternative view albeit at a distance and only from one side. The upper-level walkway looks down on the column and does give views all round, but at a significant distance and this is not open to the public.

Portico de la Gloria

The portal, known as the Portico de la Gloria is from the Cathedral of Santiago de Compostela in Spain. The original dates from the 12th century and is by the Master Mateo.

In 1865, Robinson had visited Santiago de Compostela and on seeing the cathedral urged for a cast of the doorway to be made. This was prior to the construction of the Cast Courts and so allowed for the design to accommodate this vast artefact. The task of making the cast went to Domenico Brucciani & Company, a firm that later effectively acted as a franchise of the museum and continued to make casts until the early 1920s. 

The casting of this immense structure required an arduous sea voyage and protracted, delicate negotiations with the ecclesiastical authorities. At the opening of the Cast Courts, the cast of the Portico de la Gloria was critically acclaimed and was applauded as a "glory to the museum".

Baptistry Doors

This copy is an electrotype of the Florence Baptistry Doors known as the Gates of Paradise by Lorenzo Ghiberti.

School of Athens

There is a painted copy of Raphael's School of Athens over 4 metres by 8 metres in size, dated 1755 by Anton Raphael Mengs on display in the eastern Cast Court.

Pulpit from Pisa Cathedral

The plaster cast of a pulpit was constructed after the marble original which once stood in the Cathedral of Pisa. The pulpit has inscriptions running round the frieze and the base that make it clear that the sculptor was Giovanni Pisano (1250–1314) and that the work was completed by 1311.

Reliefs show scenes from the life of Christ and the Last Judgment. A central support comprises images of the three Virtues over a base depicting the Liberal Arts. The two supports nearest the front of the pulpit depict Christ over the Four Evangelists and Ecclesia over the four Cardinal Virtues.

The original pulpit was dismantled in 1602 following a fire in the cathedral. A new pulpit by Fancelli was installed 25 years later, it used some of Pisano's original carvings and the rest, including the narrative reliefs, were used elsewhere in the cathedral. Interest in the original appearance of the pulpit was re-awakened in the nineteenth century. Pisan sculptor Giovanni Fontana worked on a reconstruction carved from wood and in 1865 a group of British bronze sculptors produced their own reconstruction. The two reconstructions differed in detail. This cast seems to be from this 1865 reconstruction. Another copy of this cast was shown in the Exposition Universelle in Paris, in 1867.

The present pulpit in the Cathedral in Pisa is a reconstruction by Peleo Baccithat assembled in 1926. The reconstruction incorporates most of the fragments from the original although some are dispersed in museums around the world. The 1926 reconstruction differs substantially from the earlier reconstructions and has been described as problematic.

Three Davids

Michelangelo's David was the museum's first major cast of Italian figure sculpture. It was acquired in 1857 when it was sent as a gift from the Grand Duke of Tuscany to Queen Victoria — apparently in an attempt to placate English anger at his refusal to allow the National Gallery to export Domenico Ghirlandaio's Madonna Enthroned. The gift was entirely unexpected and the Queen promptly gave the cast to the then South Kensington Museum which is now the Victoria and Albert Museum.

In the reign of Queen Victoria, the display of male nudity was contentious and the Queen herself was said to find it shocking. The museum commissioned a suitably proportioned fig leaf that was kept in readiness in case of a visit by the Queen or other female dignitary: the fig leaf was then hung on the figure using a pair of hooks. Today, the fig leaf is no longer used, but it is displayed in a case at the back of the cast's plinth.

Donatello's bronze statue of David (circa 1440s) is notable as the first unsupported standing work in bronze cast since classical times. The cast is painted to resemble the bronze of the original.

A third image of David is a cast of David by Verrocchio.

Other notable casts

Early in the 20th century, there was something of a reaction against copying works of art and interest in the collection — and other similar collections — declined. Only more recently has revived interest in the collection led to its once again being fully appreciated.

In recent years, the Cast Courts have been used to display the works of contemporary artists. From November 2003 until June 2004, artist Rachel Whiteread's cast of Room 101: the BBC office where George Orwell worked some years before writing his famous novel Nineteen Eighty-Four. The original room 101 was demolished in the restructuring of Broadcasting House.

References

External links
The Cast Courts — Victoria and Albert Museum
"A story of two halves: The Trajan column cast", by Diane Bilbey.

Sculptures of the Victoria and Albert Museum
Plaster cast collections